Michael Anthony Stewart (born July 13, 1965) is a former American football safety who played seven seasons in the National Football League for the Los Angeles Rams. He then played three seasons for the Miami Dolphins.

Three times Stewart was drafted in baseball but he finally opted for pro football after an outstanding career with the Fresno State U., Bulldogs. The Rams, who have been less than astute with their higher draft picks, did themselves proud in grabbing Stewart as an eighth-rounder in 1987. Although a linebacker and pass rusher at BC, Stewart was converted to safety by Fresno coach Jim Sweeney and in that role, has established himself as a fast, hard hitter for the Rams, with aggressiveness that spills over to special team.

In 1992, Stewart started all 16 games last season and was second on the team in tackles with 81. He had two interceptions, forced two fumbles and had a sack. He made a reported $270,000 last year and when negotiations on a new contract began this year he argued that he was worth about three times that much.

The Rams originally offered a three-year deal worth about $650,000 a year, but by the time Stewart ended his holdout, he had settled for a $1.1 million, two-year deal.

References

American football safeties
Players of American football from California
1965 births
Living people
People from Atascadero, California
Fresno State Bulldogs football players
Los Angeles Rams players
Miami Dolphins players
Ed Block Courage Award recipients